Boletus rugulosiceps is a species of bolete fungus in the family Boletaceae. Found in Belize, it was described  as new to science in 2007.

See also
 List of Boletus species

References

External links

rugulosiceps
Fungi described in 2007
Fungi of Central America